The Orion–Eridanus Superbubble or Eridanus Soft X-ray Enhancement is a superbubble located west of the Orion Nebula. The region is formed from overlapping supernova remnants that may be associated with the Orion OB1 stellar association; the bubble is approximately 1200 ly across. It is the nearest superbubble to the Local Bubble containing the Sun, with the respective shock fronts being about 500 ly apart.

The structure was discovered from 21 cm radio observations by Carl Heiles and interstellar optical emission line observations by Reynolds and Ogden in the 1970s.

See also
Barnard's Loop

References

Orion molecular cloud complex
Supernovae